The 1925–26 Washington Huskies men's basketball team represented the University of Washington for the  NCAA college basketball season. Led by sixth-year head coach Hec Edmundson, the Huskies were members of the Pacific Coast Conference and played their home games on campus in Seattle, Washington.

References

External links
Sports Reference – Washington Huskies: 1925–26 basketball season
Washington Huskies men's basketball media guide (2009–10) – History

Washington Huskies men's basketball seasons
Washington Huskies
Washington
Washington